William Trulock Beeks (May 6, 1906 – December 30, 1988) was a United States district judge of the United States District Court for the Western District of Washington.

Education and career

Born in El Reno, Oklahoma, Beeks received a Bachelor of Laws from the University of Washington School of Law in 1932. He was in private practice in Seattle, Washington from 1932 to 1942 before serving in the United States Army during World War II, from 1942 to 1946, where he achieved the rank of Colonel. He served as lead defense attorney for the 43 prisoners tried in the Fort Lawton Riot case, the largest and longest United States Army court-martial of World War II. He returned to private practice in Seattle from 1947 to 1961.

Federal judicial service

On August 4, 1961, Beeks was nominated by President John F. Kennedy to a seat on the United States District Court for the Western District of Washington vacated by Judge John Clyde Bowen. Beeks was confirmed by the United States Senate on August 15, 1961, and received his commission the same day. He served as Chief Judge from 1971 to 1973, assuming senior status due to a certified disability on May 31, 1973, and serving in that capacity until his death on December 30, 1988, in Seattle.

References

Sources
 

1906 births
1988 deaths
Judges of the United States District Court for the Western District of Washington
United States district court judges appointed by John F. Kennedy
20th-century American judges
United States Army officers
University of Washington School of Law alumni